KTPO (106.7 FM) is a radio station  broadcasting an adult album alternative format to the communities of Bonner County Idaho. Prior to April 2011, The station broadcast an album oriented rock format branded as "106.7 The Point"

In April 2011, KTPO ceased origination of its own format and became a repeater for Blue Sky Broadcasting' 95.3 KPND.  KPND's coverage in Sandpoint was reduced when it upgraded and relocated its transmitter to the south several years ago. Using KTPO to simulcast KPND returned KPND to full city grade coverage in Bonner County.

In 2022, after KPND upgraded its power to 100,000 watts, KTPO broke off from KPND and launched a new classic hits format branded as "106.7 Max FM".

Licensed to Kootenai, Idaho, United States, the station is currently owned by Hellroaring Communications L.L.C.

References

External links

TPO
Classic hits radio stations in the United States